The 1997 Bloc Québécois leadership election was the leadership election that picked the new leader to replace Michel Gauthier as leader. The leadership election was conducted by a one member, one vote (OMOV) process involving all party members.  Voters were asked to list their first, second and third choices on the ballot. Bloc MP Gilles Duceppe won the leadership election.

Timeline
February 17, 1996: Michel Gauthier became leader of the Bloc Québécois.
March 15, 1997: Gilles Duceppe won the leadership election on the 2nd ballot.

Candidates

Result

Sources

1997
1997 elections in Canada
1997 in Quebec
Bloc Québécois leadership election